All Saints' Church or Stand Church is an active Anglican parish church in Stand, Whitefield, Greater Manchester, England.  It is in the deanery of Radcliffe and Prestwich, the archdeaconry of Bolton, and the diocese of Manchester.  The church is recorded in the National Heritage List for England as a designated Grade I-listed building.  It was a Commissioners' church, having received a grant towards its construction from the Church Building Commission.  The church is a tall building, standing on high ground, and is constructed on a platform.

History
Built between 1821 and 1826, All Saints' Church is one of the many Commissioners' churches built to celebrate the defeat of Napoleon at the Battle of Waterloo in 1815. The land on which the church and vicarage were built was given to the parish by the Earl of Derby. The architect Sir John Soane was invited to design the church to accommodate about 1,800 people, and to cost no more than £12,000.  He declined and passed the commission to Charles Barry.  This church was Barry's first commission.  Its design was similar to his design for St Matthew, Campfield. Manchester (which has since been demolished); differing in being provided with a tower, rather than a spire.  A grant of £13,812 (equivalent to £ as of ) was given towards its construction by the Church Building Commission.  The foundation stone was laid on 3 August 1821, and the church was consecrated by the Bishop of Chester on 8 September 1826.

Architecture

Exterior
All Saints is constructed in millstone grit from the Pennines.  The architectural style is described as "fanciful" Gothic.  The plan of the church is rectangular in five bays, with a canted apse at the east end, and a west porch and tower.  The lowest stage of the tower forms the porch, which is entered through tall narrow pointed arches.  The bell openings are pairs of lancets.  Along the sides of the church are two tiers of windows.  The tower and the body of the church have embattled parapets and crocketed pinnacles.

Interior
Inside the church are galleries on three sides carried on slender Perpendicular piers.  The plaster ceilings are vaulted.  The altar, screen and pulpit date from 1921, the choir stalls and side screens date from 1937; all of these were designed by the Lancaster architects Austin and Paley.  The stained glass in the east window dates from 1841 and is by D. Evans of Shrewsbury.  Elsewhere are windows by Lavers, Barraud and Westlake, and by A. L. Moore, the latter dating from 1921.  The monuments include one by Sievier dating from 1826 depicting a lady lying on a chaise longue.

The original organ was built by Samuel Renn in 1827 and situated in the west gallery.  It was moved in 1880 to the north aisle.  This organ was removed from the church in 1957.  It was replaced by the present three manual organ made by Charles A. Smethurst.  This organ was rebuilt in 1997 by Nicholson of Worcester.  There is a ring of eight bells, all of which were cast in 1912 by Gillett and Johnston. During the 1930s there was a twenty-year programme of adornment and refurnishing of the sanctuary and chancel, culminating in the installation of a new choir stall, organ screen and clergy desks in 1937.

See also

List of churches in Greater Manchester
Grade I listed churches in Greater Manchester
Listed buildings in Whitefield, Greater Manchester
List of Commissioners' churches in Northeast and Northwest England

References

Notes

Citations

Bibliography

Grade I listed churches in Greater Manchester
Church of England church buildings in Greater Manchester
Stand
Commissioners' church buildings
Churches completed in 1826
19th-century Church of England church buildings
Stand
1826 establishments in England
Whitefield, Greater Manchester
Charles Barry buildings